'Queens of Clubs Trilogy: The Best of Nadia Ali Remixed' is a three-part compilation of remixed tracks by Libyan-born American singer-songwriter Nadia Ali. The albums feature songs from her time as one-half of iiO and her subsequent solo career. The compilation celebrates Ali's decade-long career as a musician. The title of the trilogy was inspired by Ali's 'un-rivalled contributions to dance music and club culture'. The first installment, Ruby Edition, was released on August 31, 2010 by Smile in Bed Records.

Track listing

Credits
Track 3: Collaboration with Tocadisco
Track 4: Collaboration with Schiller

References

External links 
Queen of Clubs Trilogy: Ruby Edition at Amazon

2010 compilation albums
Nadia Ali (singer) albums